Wola Krobowska  is a village in the administrative district of Gmina Grójec, within Grójec County, Masovian Voivodeship, in west-central Poland.

References

Wola Krobowska